Gregg Chilingirian (born 15 December 1988) better known by his stage name Gregg Chillin, is an English actor and writer born in Cambridgeshire.

Early life
Gregg Chilingirian was born in December 1988 in Cambridge to parents of Armenian and English descent.

Career
Chillin is notable for his role as ruthless vampire Domenico in SKY, HBO and AMC's A Discovery of Witches in its third season.

He has appeared in many television shows over the years, including Zoroaster da Peretola in David S. Goyer's TV series Da Vinci's Demons. Owen in the first series of BBC Three's Being Human, BBC One's Inside Men, Waking the Dead and Zen playing the character of Pepe Spadola alongside Rufus Sewell.

He provided the voice of Ron Weasley in several of the Harry Potter Video Games.

Chillin made his stage debut at the Royal National Theatre playing Mark in Dennis Kelly's DNA in 2008.

Chillin played Lord Ingtar Shinowa in The Wheel of Time.

Filmography

Film

Television

Video games

Theme parks

References

External links
 

English male television actors
English male voice actors
1988 births
Living people
English people of Armenian descent